Far East can refer to:

 Far East, a term often used by people in the Western world to refer to the countries of East Asia
 Far East (film), a 1982 Australian drama film
 Far East (play), an A. R. Gurney play
 Far East (2001 film), an American adaptation of the play directed by Daniel J. Sullivan
 The Far East (periodical), a newspaper published in Japan
 Russian Far East, a term that refers to the Russian part of the Far East